Ronald Henry Fokes,  (1913 – 12 June 1944) was a Royal Air Force fighter pilot and flying ace of the Second World War, credited with nine confirmed "kills".

RAF career
Fokes joined the Royal Air Force Volunteer Reserve in 1937, and eventually joined No. 151 Squadron RAF in April 1939, moving to No. 87 Squadron RAF a few days later. After the outbreak of the Second World War he joined No. 92 Squadron RAF in January 1940. He was awarded the Distinguished Flying Medal in November 1940, and commissioned later the same month.

In May 1941 he was posted to No. 53 Operational Training Unit (OTU) at Heston as an instructor and then to the Central Flying School, Upavon on an instructor's course. A spell at No. 61 OTU followed. In November 1941 he joined No. 154 Squadron as a flight commander. In March 1942 he joined No. 56 Squadron flying the Hawker Typhoon. In August he became a test pilot on Typhoons at Gloster Aircraft, until February 1943 when he returned to operations with No. 193 Squadron.

Fokes took command of No. 257 Squadron RAF flying the Hawker Typhoon in July 1943. He was awarded the Distinguished Flying Cross in March 1944, and was due to end his tour just before D-Day, but elected to remain with the squadron until after the invasion. His aircraft was shot down over Caen, France, during a ground attack mission. Fokes bailed out, but was killed when he hit the ground before his parachute opened.

List of air victories
Fokes' combat record reads: nine kills, four shared kills, two unconfirmed kills, three probable kills, one damaged and one shared damaged.

Honours and awards
 15 November 1940 – 740109 Sergeant Ronald Henry Fokes, Royal Air Force Volunteer Reserve, No. 92 Squadron is awarded the Distinguished Flying Medal:

 10 March 1944 – Acting Squadron Leader Ronald Henry Fokes, DFM (88439), Royal Air Force Volunteer Reserve, No. 257 Squadron is awarded the Distinguished Flying Cross:

References

Notes

Bibliography

 Price, Dr. Alfred. Spitfire Mark I/II Aces 1939–1941. Botley, Kent, UK: Osprey Publishing, 1996. .
 Thomas, Andrew. Griffon Spitfire Aces. Botley, Kent, UK: Osprey Publishing, 2008. .

Royal Air Force Volunteer Reserve personnel of World War II
Royal Air Force squadron leaders
Royal Air Force pilots of World War II
Royal Air Force personnel killed in World War II
British World War II flying aces
Recipients of the Distinguished Flying Cross (United Kingdom)
Recipients of the Distinguished Flying Medal
English aviators
1944 deaths
The Few
1913 births
Aviators killed by being shot down
People from Rotherham
Military personnel from Yorkshire